S.S. Comprensorio Montalto Uffugo Calcio is an Italian association football is an Italian association football club, based in Montalto Uffugo, Calabria. It currently plays in Serie D.

History
In the season 2011–12 the team was promoted for the first time, from Eccellenza Calabria to Serie D.

Colors and badge
The colors of the team are white and blue.

References

External links
 Official Web Site 

Football clubs in Calabria